The Oxford Society of Change Ringers, established in 1734, is a society dedicated to change ringing in Oxford, England. It should not be confused with the Oxford University Society of Change Ringers.  The society is based at the Cathedral Church of Christ where its members ring for Sunday services as well as practising there twice a month. Weekly practices are held at Lincoln College, in the former All Saints Church, now the College library, which still has a peal of eight bells.

Other towers at which the Oxford Society rings include:

Carfax Tower
Magdalen College
Merton College
New College
University Church of St Mary the Virgin
Tom Tower, Christ Church (Tom Tower holds the bell of Great Tom, which is swung for special occasions)

References

External links
Oxford Society of Change Ringers website

Bell ringing societies in England
Organizations established in 1734
Change Ringers, Oxford Society of
Change Ringers, Oxford Society of
Lincoln College, Oxford
1734 establishments in England